Pseudalbara is a genus of moths belonging to the subfamily Drepaninae.

Species
Pseudalbara parvula (Leech, 1890)
Pseudalbara fuscifascia Watson, 1968

References

Drepaninae
Drepanidae genera